Birendra Lakra (born 3 February 1990) is an Indian professional field hockey player. He represents India in men's field hockey and recently came out of retirement alongside Rupinderpal Singh and will be the Captain of Indian team in the Asia Cup to be held in Jakarta, Indonesia. In Tokyo 2020 also, he had been selected as Vice Captain of Indian team. Lakra's elder brother Bimal has played as a midfielder for India. His sister Asunta Lakra has played for India's women's hockey team and has captained the side and in 2021 he was awarded with Arjuna award.

Personal life
Birendra Lakra was born on 3 February 1990 in the village of Lachchada in the Sundargarh District of Odisha, on the border with Jharkhand. He was born to a family belonging to an Oraon tribe.

Career
Birendra Lakra is a player for the Rourkela Steel Plant's SAIL Hockey Academy. He was included in the Indian junior team for the first time for the Singapore tour in 2007.  He represented India in the Test series against South Africa in 2012, in the Champions Challenge tournament in South Africa in 2011, at the SAAF Games at Dhaka in 2010, at the Youth Olympics at Sydney in 2009 and at the Junior World Cup at Singapore in 2009.

He scored the first goal in India's victory in the final game of the Olympic Hockey Qualifying Tournament against France. He played a key role in taking India in to the semifinals of 2012 Champions Trophy. India defeated Belgium with the help of a single goal that was produced by the pass given by Birendra Lakra to the forward. With this India reached the semifinals of the Champions Trophy for the first time in eight years.

At the 2014 Commonwealth Games, Lakra won a silver medal with India.

Hockey India League
In the auction of the inaugural Hockey India League season, Lakra was bought by the Ranchi franchise for US$41,000 with his base price being US$9,250. The Ranchi team was named Ranchi Rhinos. The team finished first in the inaugural season and third in the 2014 season. Following disputes between the franchise and Hockey India, the team decided to pull out, after which Lakra signed with the Ranchi Rays franchise from the 2015 season.

References

External links
Birendra Lakra at Hockey India

1990 births
Living people
People from Sundergarh district
Field hockey players from Odisha
Indian male field hockey players
Male field hockey defenders
Olympic field hockey players of India
Field hockey players at the 2012 Summer Olympics
Field hockey players at the 2020 Summer Olympics
2014 Men's Hockey World Cup players
Field hockey players at the 2014 Commonwealth Games
Field hockey players at the 2014 Asian Games
Field hockey players at the 2018 Asian Games
2018 Men's Hockey World Cup players
Asian Games gold medalists for India
Asian Games bronze medalists for India
Asian Games medalists in field hockey
Medalists at the 2014 Asian Games
Medalists at the 2018 Asian Games
Commonwealth Games silver medallists for India
Commonwealth Games medallists in field hockey
Olympic bronze medalists for India
Medalists at the 2020 Summer Olympics
Olympic medalists in field hockey
Recipients of the Arjuna Award
Medallists at the 2014 Commonwealth Games